The 2019 Tamworth Borough Council election took place on 2 May 2019 to elect members of Tamworth Borough Council in England. This was on the same day as other local elections.

Ward results

Amington

Belgrave

Bolehall

Castle

Glascote

Mercian

Spital

Stonydelph

Trinity

Wilnecote

References

2019 English local elections
2019
2010s in Staffordshire